Basanti Assembly constituency is a Legislative Assembly constituency of South 24 Parganas district in the Indian State of West Bengal. It is reserved for Scheduled Castes.

Overview
As per order of the Delimitation Commission in respect of the Delimitation of constituencies in the West Bengal, Basanti Assembly constituency is composed of the following:
 Amjhara, Basanti, Bharatgarh, Phulmalancha, Jharkhali, Jyotishpur, Kanthalberia, Nafarganj, Ramchandrakhali, Uttar Mokam Baria and Charavidya gram panchayats of Basanti community development block
 Atharbanki gram panchayat of Canning II community development block

Basanti Assembly constituency is a part of No. 19 Jaynagar (Lok Sabha constituency).

Members of Legislative Assembly

Election Results

2021

Legislative Assembly Election 2016

Legislative Assembly Election 2011

Legislative Assembly Elections 1977-2006
Subhas Naskar of RSP won the Basanti Assembly constituency from 1982 to 2006, defeating Amal Kanti Roy of BJP in 2006, Jayanta Sarkar of AITC in 2001 and 1996, Bipin Behari Sardar of INC in 1991 and 1987, and Jnanendranath Majumdar of INC in 1982. Kalipada Barman of RSP defeated Chittaranjan Naskar of INC in 1977.

Legislative Assembly Elections 1962-1972
Panchanan Sinha of INC won in 1972 and 1971. Ashok Chaudhuri of RSP won in 1969. Shakila Khatun of INC won in 1967 and 1962. The seat did not exist prior to that.

References

Notes

Citations

Assembly constituencies of West Bengal
Politics of South 24 Parganas district